The Big Shot with Bethenny is an American reality competition streaming television series following Bethenny Frankel as she searches for the second-in-command to her business empire Skinnygirl and brands. It premiered on April 29, 2021, on HBO Max.

Plot
Bethenny Frankel searches for the second-in-command to her business empire Skinnygirl and other brands.

Contestants

Episodes

Production
In February 2020, it was announced Bethenny Frankel would star and executive produce a reality competition series at HBO Max, with MGM Television set to produce, with Mark Burnett set to serve as an executive producer. In March 2020, Frankel stated the series was on hold due to the COVID-19 pandemic.

Principal photography on the series commenced by November 2020.

Reception
On Rotten Tomatoes, the series holds an approval rating of 33% based on 6 reviews, with an average rating of 3.4/10.

Daniel D'Addario of Variety gave the series a positive review writing: "As a portrait of what the ruthlessly competitive market for business success and for our eyeballs does to one's sense of generosity and of proportion, The Big Shot with Bethenny is riveting television." Joel Keller of Decider wrote: "Although The Big Shot With Bethenny isn't the dose of pure uncut Bethenny Frankel we want, well take whatever we can get."

Joan Summers of Jezebel panned the series writing: "Faux-feminist torture porn, in which Frankel reigns like a feudal lord eager to sacrifice their starved and overworked serfs." Shannon Keating of BuzzFeed praised Frankel's reality television presence but wrote: "But just because someone's star power gets you in the door doesn't mean you're gonna stick around. if I wasn't reviewing The Big Shot, I doubt I would have made it past a couple episodes.

References

External links

 

2020s American reality television series
2021 American television series debuts
2021 American television series endings
English-language television shows
HBO Max original programming
Reality competition television series
Television series by MGM Television